The 1964 UMass Redmen football team represented the University of Massachusetts Amherst in the 1964 NCAA College Division football season as a member of the Yankee Conference. The team was coached by Vic Fusia and played its home games at Alumni Field in Amherst, Massachusetts. The 1964 season was the Redmen's last at Alumni Field, as they would move to the new Alumni Stadium at the south end of campus in 1965. The Redmen repeated as conference champions, and earned an appearance in the 1964 Tangerine Bowl, which at the time served as the NCAA Atlantic Coast Small College Championship. This was the first postseason bowl game in team history. Though the Redmen jumped out to an early 13–0 lead, they tired late and fell to East Carolina, 14–13. UMass finished the season with a record of 8–2 overall and 5–0 in conference play.

Schedule

References

UMass
UMass Minutemen football seasons
Yankee Conference football champion seasons
UMass Redmen football